Baron Aberdare, of Duffryn in the County of Glamorgan, is a title in the Peerage of the United Kingdom. It was created on 23 August 1873 for the Liberal politician Henry Bruce. He served as Home Secretary from 1868 to 1873. His grandson, the third Baron, was a soldier, cricketer and tennis player and a member of the International Olympic Committee. His son, the fourth Baron, held office in the Conservative administration of Edward Heath and was later a Deputy Speaker of the House of Lords. Lord Aberdare was one of the ninety-two elected hereditary peers that were allowed to remain in the House of Lords after the passing of the House of Lords Act 1999.  the title is held by his son, the fifth Baron, who succeeded in 2005 and was elected to the House of Lords in 2009.

Coat of arms
The heraldic blazon for the coat of arms of the family is: Or, a saltire gules, on a chief of the last a martlet of the field.

Baron Aberdare (1873)
Henry Austin Bruce, 1st Baron Aberdare (1815–1895)
Henry Campbell Bruce, 2nd Baron Aberdare (1851–1929)
Clarence Napier Bruce, 3rd Baron Aberdare (1885–1957)
Morys George Lyndhurst Bruce, 4th Baron Aberdare (1919–2005)
Alastair John Lyndhurst Bruce, 5th Baron Aberdare (born 1947)

The heir apparent is the present holder's son, Hector Morys Napier Bruce (born 1974).

Male-line family tree

References

Bibliography

Baronies in the Peerage of the United Kingdom
Noble titles created in 1873
Noble titles created for UK MPs
Barons Aberdare